Charles Fairfax may refer to:

Charles Fairfax (antiquary) (1597–1673), genealogist and antiquary
Charles S. Fairfax (1829–1869), American politician
Charles Fairfax (soldier) (1567–1604), English soldier
Charles Fairfax, 5th Viscount Fairfax of Emley (died 1711), English peer
 Charles Fairfax (priest), Church of Ireland priest